This is a partial list of 20th-century women artists, sorted alphabetically by decade of birth. These artists are known for creating artworks that are primarily visual in nature, in traditional media such as painting, sculpture, photography, printmaking, ceramics as well as in more recently developed genres, such as installation art, performance art, conceptual art, digital art and video art. Do not add entries for those without a Wikipedia article.

The list covers artists born in 1870 through 1969. For later births see List of 21st-century women artists.

Before 1870

Louise Abbéma (1858–1927), painter, printmaker, sculptor
Helen Allingham (1848–1926), painter, illustrator
Laura Alma-Tadema (1852–1909), painter
Ester Almqvist (1869–1934), Swedish painter
Anna Ancher (1859–1935), Danish painter
Sophie Anderson (1823–1903), painter
Marie-Elmina Anger (1844–1901), nun and painter
Helen Maitland Armstrong (1869–1948), stained glass artist
Lucy Angeline Bacon (1857–1932), painter
Alice Pike Barney (1857–1931), painter
Susie M. Barstow (1836–1923), painter
Jane E. Bartlett (1839–1923), painter and portraitist
Cecilia Beaux (1855–1942), painter
Julie Hart Beers (1835–1913), painter
Enella Benedict (1858–1942), American painter 
Harriet Blackstone (1864–1939), figure painter
Anna Boch (1848–1936), painter
Alice Boughton (c. 1866–1943), photographer
Marie Bracquemond (1841–1916), painter
Susan Hinckley Bradley (1851–1929), American painter
Fidelia Bridges (1834–1923), watercolorist
Caroline Shawk Brooks (1840–1913), American sculptor
Matilda Browne (1869–1947), American painter 
Elizabeth Eaton Burton (1869–1937), painter, printmaker, designer
Sally Bush (1860–1946), photographer
Evelyn Cameron (1868–1928), photographer
Mary Cassatt (1844–1926), painter, printmaker
Nellie Charlie (1867–1965), basket weaver
Christabel Cockerell (1863–1951), painter
Kate Cory (1861–1958), painter, sculptor
Helene Cramer (1844–1916), painter
Molly Cramer (1852–1936), painter
Annie I. Crawford (1856–1942), painter, printmaker
Alice Dannenberg (1861–1948), painter
Jenny Eakin Delony (1866–1949), painter
Cécile Douard (1866–1941), painter, sculptor
Florence Dreyfous (1868–1950), painter
Elisabeth von Eicken (1862–1940), German landscape painter
Florence Esté (1860–1926), painter
Johanna van Eybergen (1865–1950), applied artist and designer
Frances C. Fairman (1839–1923), animal painter, illustrator
Eva Scott Fényes (1849–1930), painter 
Olga Fialka (1848–1930), painter, illustrator
Elsa von Freytag-Loringhoven (1874–1927), Dada artist, happening artist, painter, sculptor
Laura Ann Fry (1857–1943), ceramic painter
Frances Gearhart (1869–1959), printmaker and watercolorist
Grace Woodbridge Geer (1854–1938), painter 
Anna Gerresheim (1852–1921), German painter
Anne Goldthwaite (1869–1944), printmaker, painter
Caroline Gotch (1854–1945), painter
Jane Hawkins (1841–1904), portrait artist
Wilhelmina Douglas Hawley (1860–1958), painter
Laura Coombs Hills (1859–1952), painter
Anna Hope (Nan) Hudson (1869–1957), painter
Frances Benjamin Johnston (1864–1952), photographer
Gertrude Käsebier (1852–1934), photographer
Mina Karadžić (1828–1894), painter
Lucy Kemp-Welch (1869–1958), painter
Louisa Keyser (Datsolalee) (c. 1829/1850–1925), Washoe basket weaver
Kitty Lange Kielland (1843–1914), painter
Hilma af Klint (1862–1944), painter
Käthe Kollwitz (1867–1945), printmaker, sculptor, painter
Ida Pulis Lathrop (1859–1937), American painter
Jessie Lipscomb (1861–1952), sculptor
Séraphine Louis (1864–1942), painter
Maria Magdalena Łubieńska (1833–1920), Polish painter and founder of an arts school.
Carol Brooks MacNeil (1871–1944), American sculptor
Bessie MacNicol (1869–1904), painter
Jacqueline Marval (1866–1932), French painter
Cornelia F. Maury (1866–1942), American pastel artist
Blanche Hoschedé Monet (1865–1947), painter
Grandma Moses (1860–1961), painter
Dora Louise Murdoch (1857–1933), painter
Iris Nampeyo (c. 1860–1942), potter, ceramic artist
Clara Chipman Newton (1848–1936), china painter
Clara Weaver Parrish (1861–1925) painter, stained glass
Lilla Cabot Perry (1848–1933), painter
Edith Mitchill Prellwitz (1865–1944), painter
Vinnie Ream (1847–1914), sculptor
Suze Robertson (1855–1922), painter
Adelaïde Alsop Robineau (1865–1929), ceramic artist
Helene Schjerfbeck (1862–1946), painter
Anna Page Scott (1863–1925), painter
Janet Scudder (1869–1940), sculptor
Annie Ware Sabine Siebert (1864–1947), painter 
Martha Simkins (1866–1969), painter 
Jessie Willcox Smith (1863–1935), painter, illustrator
Gertrude Spencer-Stanhope (1857–1944), sculptor, painter
Eloise Harriet Stannard (1829–1915), painter
Emily Coppin Stannard (1803–1885), painter
Marianne Stokes (1855–1927), painter
Eva Stort (1855–1936), painter
Austa Densmore Sturdevant (1855–1936), painter
Josefine Swoboda (1861–1924), Austrian portrait painter
Annie Swynnerton (1844–1933), painter
Emma Beach Thayer (1849–1924), painter 
Ellen Thesleff (1869–1954), painter
Juliet Thompson (1873–1956), painter
Suzanne Valadon (1865–1938), painter
Marianne von Werefkin (1860–1938), painter
Candace Wheeler (1827–1923), interior and textile designer
Anna Lillian Winegar (1867–1941), painter and illustrator

1870–1879

Zella de Milhau (1870–1954), printmaker
Dorothea A. Dreier (1870–1923), painter
Martha Stettler (1870–1945), painter
Enid Yandell (1870–1934), sculptor
Emily Carr (1871–1945), painter
Edith Woodman Burroughs (1871–1916), sculptor
Elizabeth Campbell Fisher Clay (1871–1959), lithographer, etcher
Elinor Darwin (1871–1954), engraver, portrait painter
Eliza Gardiner (1871–1955), painter and printmaker
Elizabeth Shippen Green (1871–1954), painter, illustrator
Emily Nichols Hatch (1871–1959), painter
Anna Ostroumova-Lebedeva (1871–1955), graphic artist, watercolorist
Florine Stettheimer (1871–1944), painter

May Gearhart (1872–1951), printmaker
Bertha Zillessen (1872–1936), photographer, painter
Ethel Carrick (1872–1952), English painter
Pauline Powell Burns (1872–1912), first African-American artist to exhibit in California.
Mary Foote (1872–1968), painter
Edna Boies Hopkins (1872–1947), woodcut prints
Edith Maryon (1872–1924), sculptor
Virginia Randall McLaws (1872–1967), painter
Nadežda Petrović (1872–1922), painter
Helena Sturtevant (1872–1946), painter
Bessie Potter Vonnoh (1872–1955), sculptor
Beta Vukanović (1872–1972), painter

Ethel Sands (1873–1962), painter
Fanny Adele Watson (1873–1947), painter, lithographer
Gertrude Partington Albright (1874–1959), American artist
Romaine Brooks (1874–1970), painter
Isabel Codrington (1874–1943), English painter
Mabel Esplin (1874–1921), stained glass artist
Elsa von Freytag-Loringhoven (1874–1927), Dada artist and poet
Violet Oakley (1874–1961), muralist, stained glass
Henrika Šantel (1874–1940), painter
Anne Belle Stone (1874–1949), painter
Nellie Walker (1874–1973), sculptor

Elenore Abbott (1875–1935), painter, teacher
Lizzy Ansingh (1875–1959), painter
Erma Bossi (1875–1952), painter
Clara McDonald Williamson (1875–1976), painter
Dulah Marie Evans (1875–1951), painter, photographer
Delle Miller (1875–1932), painter
Margaret Preston (1875–1963), painter, printmaker

Edith Dimock (1876–1955), painter
Christian Jane Fergusson (1876–1957), painter
Emily Parker Groom (1876–1975), painter
Lillian Genth (1876–1953), painter
Fairlie Harmar (1876-1945), painter
Gwen John (1876–1939), painter
Maude Kerns (1876–1965), American painter and avant garde artist
Paula Modersohn-Becker (1876–1907), painter

Else Berg (1877–1942), painter
Katherine Sophie Dreier (1877–1952), painter
Meta Vaux Warrick Fuller (1877–1968), sculptor, painter, poet
Elena Guro (1877–1913), painter, writer
Kata Kalivoda (1877–1936), painter
Laura Knight (1877–1970), painter and war artist
Gabriele Münter (1877–1962), painter
Käte Schaller-Härlin (1877–1973), painter
Hilda Annetta Walker (1877–1960), sculptor and painter
Mabel May Woodward (1877–1945), painter

Margaret Gere (1878–1965), painter
Edith Haworth (1878–1953), painter
Wilhelmina Weber Furlong (1878–1962), painter, teacher
Anna Coleman Ladd (1878–1939), sculptor
Sr. Maria Stanisia (née Monica Kurkowski; 1878–1967), painter
Pamela Colman Smith (1878–1951), illustrator and painter
Ellen Trotzig (1878–1949), painter
Emmy Worringer (1878–1961), German artist
Émilie Charmy (1878–1974), painter
Frances Farrand Dodge (1878–1969), painter and illustrator

Elisabeth Epstein (1879–1956), painter
Nell Choate Jones (1879–1981), painter, teacher
Thea Schleusner (1879–1964), painter
Anna Heyward Taylor (1879–1956), painter, printmaker
Ada Hill Walker (1879–1955), scientific illustrator and artist
Bessie Davidson (1879–1965), painter
Vanessa Bell (1879–1961), painter and interior designer

1880–1889

Rowena Meeks Abdy (1887–1945), painter
Berenice Abbott (1898–1991) photographer
Edith Cleaves Barry (1884–1969), American painter, photographer, sculptor
Bessie Marsh Brewer (1884–1952), sculptor
Nessa Cohen, (1885–1976), sculptor
Imogen Cunningham (1883–1976), photographer
Sonia Delaunay (1885–1979), painter
Tarsila do Amaral (1886–1973), Brazilian painter
Marthe Donas (1885–1967), painter
Aleksandra Ekster (1882–1949), painter
Lili Elbe (1882–1931), painter
Ester Ellqvist (1880–1918), painter
Stella Elmendorf Tylor (1885–1980), American painter
Beryl Fowler (1881–1963), English painter
Ethel Léontine Gabain (1883–1950), painter
Laura Gardin Fraser (1889–1966), sculptor
Natalia Goncharova (1881–1962), painter
Norah Neilson Gray (1882–1972), painter
Madeline Emily Green (1884–1947), painter
Tina Haim-Wentscher (1887–1974), German-Australian sculptress
Lydia Bush-Brown Head (1887–1984) American painter and designer
Ilse Heller-Lazard (1884–1934) French-Swiss painter
Sigrid Hjertén (1885–1948), painter
Hannah Höch (1889–1978), German painter, photographer, and photomontage artist
Malvina Hoffman (1887–1966), sculptor
Tora Vega Holmström (1880–1967), painter
Valentine Hugo (1887–1968), illustrator
Daisy Marguerite Hughes (1883–1968), American painter and lithographer
Dora Koch-Stetter (1881–1968), German painter (aka Dora Stetter)
Marie Laurencin (1883–1956), painter, printmaker
Constance Jenkins Macky (1883–1961), painter, teacher
Ana Marinković (1881–1973), painter
Maria Martinez (1887–1980), potter
Marlow Moss (1889–1958), sculptor, painter 
Geneva Mercer (1889–1984), sculptor
Ethel Myers (1881–1960), sculptor, painter
Ella Naper (1886–1972), jeweller & potter
Hilda Rix Nicholas (1884–1961), painter
Elizabeth Norton (artist) (1887–1985) printmaker, bronze sculptor, painter
Georgia O'Keeffe (1887–1986), painter
Olga Oppenheimer (1886–1941), German artist
Jessie Burns Parke (1889–1964), painter, illustrator
Clara Elsene Peck (1883–1968), painter, illustrator
Agnes Pelton (1881–1961), painter
Gladys Reynell (1881–1956), potter
Anne Ryan (1889–1954), painter
Zinaida Serebriakova (1884–1967), painter
Henrietta Shore (1880–1963), painter
Zulma Steele (1881–1979), painter
Helen Margaret Spanton (1877–1934), painter
Sophie Taeuber-Arp (1889–1943), painter
Lucy Telles (c. 1885–1955), Mono Lake Paiute-Yosemite Miwok basket weaver
Nadezhda Udaltsova (1886–1961), painter
Doris Ulmann (1882–1934), photographer
Vukosava Velimirović (1888–1965), sculptor
Grace Vollmer (1884–1977) American painter
Pepi Weixlgärtner-Neutra (1886–1981), Austrian-Swedish painter, graphic designer and miniaturist
Laura Wheeler Waring (1887–1948), painter
Carla Witte (1889–1943), German and Uruguayan painter and sculptor
Marta Worringer (1881–1965), German artist
Mary Agnes Yerkes (1886–1989), painter
Marguerite Zorach (née Thompson) (1887–1968), painter

1890–1899

Berenice Abbott (1898–1991), photographer
Karimeh Abbud (1896–1940), photographer
Eileen Agar (1899–1991), painter, collage
Elene Akhvlediani (1898–1975), painter
Anni Albers (1899–1994), designer, weaver and graphic artist
Elsie Allen (1899–1990), Cloverdale Pomo basket weaver
Mabel Alvarez (1891–1985), painter
Peggy Bacon (1895–1987), printmaker, painter, illustrator
Eugenie Baizerman (1899–1949), painter
Carrie Bethel (1898–1974), Mono Lake Paiute basket weaver
Clara Birnberg (1894–1989), illustrator, portraitist, sculptor
Dorrit Black (1891–1951), painter
Kathleen Blackshear (1897–1988), painter
Lucile Blanch (1895–1981), painter
Elise Blumann (1897–1990), painter
Claude Cahun (1894–1954), photographer, author
Dora Carrington (1893–1932), painter
Dorothy Coke (1897–1979), painter
Isabel Cooper (1892–1984), illustrator primarily known for depicitons of animals collected on research expeditions
Mildred Coughlin (1892–1984), painter, printmaker, illustrator
Trena Cox (1895–1980), stained glass artist
Grace Crowley (1890–1979), painter
Louise Dahl-Wolfe (1895–1989), photographer
Florence Davidson (1896–1993), Haida basket weaver
Margaret Firth (1898–1991), painter
Lillian Florsheim (1896–1988), sculptor
Helen Katharine Forbes (1891–1945), muralist
Enid Foster (1895–1979), artist, sculptor, playwright
Frances Foy (1890–1963), artist, muralist
Elsa Fraenkel (1892–1975), sculptor
Alethea Garstin (1894–1978), English painter
Laura Gilpin (1891–1979), photographer
Minetta Good (1895–1946), painter and printmaker, W.P.A. artist
Laicita Gregg (1892–1975), painter 
Maija Grotell (1899–1973), ceramic artist
Grace L. Hamilton (1894-1992), muralist
Jennie Harbour (1893–1959), illustrator
Jeanne Hébuterne (1898–1920), painter
Dörte Helm (1898–1941), artist, painter and graphic designer
Marion Huse (1896–1967), painter and printmaker, W.P.A. artist
Margaret Calkin James (1895–1985), calligrapher, graphic designer, textile printer, watercolour painter, printmaker
Lotte Jacobi (1896–1990), photographer
Alison Mason Kingsbury (1898–1988), painter, muralist
Georgina Klitgard (1893–1976), muralist
Gina Knee Brook (1898–1982), painter
Winifred Knights (1899–1947), painter
Katarzyna Kobro (1898–1951), sculptor
Anka Krizmanić (1896–1987), Croatian painter and printmaker
Dorothea Lange (1895–1965), photographer
Dorothy P. Lathrop (1891–1980), American illustrator and writer
Gertrude K. Lathrop (1896–1996), American sculptor
Tamara de Lempicka (1898–1980), painter
Lucile Lloyd (1894–1941), muralist
Lou Loeber (1894–1983), painter
Gladys M. Lux (1899–2003), painter, printmaker
Suzanne Malherbe (1892–1972), illustrator, designer
Hildreth Meière (1892–1961), mosaicist
Yevonde Middleton (1893–1975), photographer
Lilian May Miller (1895–1943), woodblock printer and painter
Tina Modotti (1896–1942), photographer
Lucia Moholy (1894–1989), photographer
Olive Mudie-Cooke (1890–1925), painter
Louise Nevelson (1899–1988), sculptor
Marjorie Ann Nuhn (1898–1988), painter
Bashka Paeff (1894–1979), sculptor
Tonita Peña (1893–1949), works on paper, muralist
Zora Petrović (1894–1962), painter
Dulcie Mary Pillers (1891–1961), medical illustrator
Orovida Camille Pissarro (1893–1968), painter, printmaker
Pearlie Posey (1894-1984), textile artist
Dod Procter (1892–1972), painter
Jessie Beard Rickly (1895-1975), painter
Hannah Ryggen (1894–1970), textile artist
Kay Sage (1898–1963), painter
Augusta Savage (1892–1962), sculptor
Bertha Schaefer (1895–1971), furniture designer, galleryist
Elsa Schiaparelli (1890–1973), fashion, textiles
Martel Schwichtenberg (1896–1945), painter and designer 
Dorothy Hope Smith (1895–1955), artist
Janet Sobel (1893–1968), painter
Varvara Stepanova (1894–1958), painter and designer
Vere Temple (1898-1980), wildlife illustrator
Alma Thomas (1891–1978), painter
Charley Toorop (1891–1955), painter
Marion Gray Traver (1892-1979), painter
Marie Elisabeth Wrede (1898-1981), painter
Beulah Woodard (1895–1955), sculptor
Ogura Yuki (1895–2000), painter

1900–1909

Gertrude Abercrombie (1909–1977), painter
Mary Adshead (1904–1995), muralist, painter
Maxine Albro (1903–1966), muralist, printmaker
Griselda Allan (1905–1987), painter
Catherine Tharp Altvater (1907–1984), painter
Grace Greenwood Ames (1905–1979) artist, muralist
Rita Angus (1908–1970), painter
Mariam Aslamazyan (1907–2006), painter
Eranuhi Aslamazyan (1910–1998), painter
Evgenia Baykova (1907–1997), painter
Celia Frances Bedford (1904–1959), painter, printmaker
Suzanne Belperron (1900–1983), jeweler
Ruth Bernhard (1905–2006), photographer
Nellie Geraldine Best (1905–1990), muralist, sculptor 
Isabel Bishop (1902–1988), painter
Frances Blakemore (1906–1997), printmaker
Lucienne Bloch (1909–1999) painter
Elisa Maria Boglino (1905–2002),painter
Dorr Bothwell (1902–2000), painter, printmaker
Margaret Bourke-White (1904–1971), photographer
Dorothea Braby (1909–1987), painter, book illustrator
Lola Álvarez Bravo (1907–1993), photographer
Emmy Bridgewater (1906–1999), painter, poet
Felicia Browne (1904–1936), artist, activist
Marjorie Frances Bruford (1902–1958), painter
Margaret Brundage (1900–1976), illustrator
Norma Bull (1906–1980), painter
Selma Burke (1900–1995), sculptor
Nancy Carline (1909–2004), painter
Ruth Chaney (1908–1973), printmaker
Marie Z. Chino (1907–1982), ceramic artist
Grace Clements (1905–1969), muralist, mosaicist, art critic
Marion Osborn Cunningham (1908–1948), printmaker
Martina Gangle Curl (1906–1994), artist, activist
Dorothy Dehner (1901–1994), sculptor, printmaker
Evelyn Dunbar (1906–1960), painter
Claire Falkenstein (1908–1997), sculptor, painter, printmaker
Perle Fine (1905–1988), painter
Leonor Fini (1907–1996), painter
Cornelia MacIntyre Foley (1909–2010), painter
Constance Edith Fowler (1907–1996), painter, printmaker, author, educator
Gisèle Freund (1908 or 1912–2000), photographer
Gyo Fujikawa 1908-1998), illustrator and author
Zhenya Gay (1906–1978), illustrator
Evelyn Gibbs (1905–1991), engraver, art teacher
Elizabeth Ginno (1907–1991) painter, printmaker
Marion Greenwood (1909–1970), artist, muralist
Edith Hamlin (1902–1992), muralist, landscape and portrait painter
Isobel Heath (1908–1989), artist, poet
Barbara Hepworth (1903–1975), sculptor
Josette Hébert-Coëffin (1906–1973)
Gertrude Hermes (1901–1983), print maker and sculptor
Elsie Dalton Hewland (1901–1979), painter
Karen Holtsmark (1907–1998), painter
Ray Howard-Jones (1903–1996), painter
Lois Mailou Jones (1905–1998), painter
Rebecca Field Jones (1905–2002), sculptor, educator
Frida Kahlo (1907–1954) painter
Maude Kegg (1904–1986), bead artist
Anna Kostrova (1909–1994), painter, graphic artist
Lee Krasner (1908–1984), painter
Doris Lee (1905–1983), painter
Ruth Harriet Louise (1903–1940), photographer
Helen Lundeberg (1908–1999), painter
Margaret Macadam (1902-1991), illustrator
Sheila Marbain (1908–2008), master printmaker 
Tatyana Mavrina (1902–1996), painter and book illustrator
 Dorothy Meredith (1906–1986), American artist and educator, known for fiber art.
Mabel McKay (1907–1993), basket weaver
Miriam McKinnie (1906–1987), muralist
Dora Maar (1907–1997), photographer, painter, poet
Maruja Mallo (1902–1995), painter
Doris Meltzer (1908–1977), printmaker and art dealer
Hansel Mieth (1909–1998), photographer
Lee Miller (1907–1977), photographer
Lisette Model (1901–1983), photographer
Barbara Morgan (1900–1992), photographer
Donia Nachshen (1903–1987), illustrator, poster artist
Fannie Nampeyo (1900–1987), potter, ceramic artist
Alice Neel (1900–1984), painter
Loukia Nicolaidou (1909–1994), painter
Olive Nuhfer (1901-1996), painter
Vevean Oviette (1902–1986), printmaker
Essie Parrish (1902–1979), Kashaya Pomo basket weaver
Betty Parsons (1900–1982), painter, gallerist
Milena Pavlović-Barili (1909–1945), painter
Irene Rice Pereira (1902–1971), painter, author
Mary Potter (1900–1981), painter
Dorothy Wagner Puccinelli (1901–1974), muralist, painter
Mildred Rackley (1906–1992), printmaker
Alice Rahon (1904–1987) painter
Margaretha Reichardt (1907–1984), textile designer
Andrée Rexroth (1902–1940), painter
Leni Riefenstahl (1902–2003), filmmaker
Elizabeth Rivers (1903-1964), painter, engraver, illustrator and author
Louise Emerson Ronnebeck (1901–1980), painter
Stella Schmolle (1908–1975), painter
Ethel Schwabacher (1903–1984), painter
Bernarda Bryson Shahn (1903–2004), painter, lithographer
Jessamine Shumate (1902–1990), painter
Elena Skuin (1909–1986), painter
Mary Tillman Smith (1904–1995), painter
Virginia Snedeker (1909–2000), painter 
Ethel Spears (1903–1974), painter
Doris Spiegel (1901–1996), illustrator, printmaker 
Sultana Suruzhon (1900–1961), painter
Lenore Tawney (1907–2007), fiber artist, sculptor
Remedios Varo (1908–1963), painter
Maria Helena Vieira da Silva (1908–1992), painter
Ilse Weber (1908–1944), painter
Thelma Frazier Winter (1903–1977), ceramic sculptor and enamelist
Henriette Wyeth (1907–1997), painter
Maria Zubreeva (1900–1991), painter, graphic artist

1910–1919

Ida Abelman (1910–2002), painter
Blanch Ackers (1914–2003), painter
Taisia Afonina (1913–1994), painter
Eileen Aldridge (1916–1990), painter, art restorer
Evgenia Antipova (1917–2009), painter
Eve Arnold (1912–2012), photographer
Gwen Barnard (1912–1988), painter, printmaker
Bernece Berkman (1911–1988), painter
Semiha Berksoy (1910–2004), painter, opera singer
Ana Bešlić (1912–2008), sculptor
Louise Bourgeois (1911–2010), sculptor
Doris Blair (born 1915), painter
Harriet Bogart (1917–1988), painter 
Eden Box (1919–1988), painter
Leonora Carrington (1917–2011), painter
Elizabeth Catlett (1915–2012) sculptor, printmaker
Chien-Ying Chang (1913–2004), painter
Malvina Cheek (1915–2016), painter
Helen Cordero (1915–1994), ceramic artist
Elaine de Kooning (1918–1989), painter
Maya Deren (1917–1961), filmmaker and theorist, photographer
Yvonne Drewry (1918–2007), painter and print-maker
Jane Frank (1918–1986), mixed-media painter, sculptor
Louise Arnstein Freedman (1915–2001), printmaker
Rosalie Gascoigne (1917–1999), sculptor, assemblage
Wilhelmina McAlpin Godfrey (1914–1994), painter
Blanche Grambs (1916–2010), painter, printmaker
Dorothy Grebenak (1913–1990), textile artist
Isabelle Greenberger (1911–1997), printmaker
Riva Helfond (1910–2002), printmaker
Carmen Herrera (1915–2022), painter
Nora Heysen (1911–2003), painter
Ruth Horsting (1919–2000), sculptor, professor
Erlund Hudson (1912–2011), painter 
Tove Jansson (1914–2001), painter, illustrator, novelist
Shirley Julian (1914–1995), painter, printmaker
Kali (1918–1998), painter
Corita Kent (1918–1986), printmaker
Gwendolyn Knight (1914–2005), painter
Gunhild Kristensen (1919–2002), stained glass artist
Jacqueline Lamba (1910–1993), painter
Maria Lassnig (1919–2014), painter
Miriam Laufer (1918–1980), painter
Helen Levitt (1913–2009), photographer
Frances Macdonald (1914–2002), painter
Mary Macqueen (1912–1994), printmaker, drawing and mixed media
Ethel Magafan (1916–1993), painter
Beatrice Mandelman (1912–1998), painter and printmaker
Agnes Martin (1912–2004), painter
Mercedes Matter née Carles (1913–2001), painter
Louisa Matthíasdóttir (1917–2000), painter
Sylvia Melland (1906–1993), painter
Corinne Mitchell (1914-1993), painter
Mona Moore (1917–2000), painter
Hilda Grossman Morris (1911–1991), sculptor
Esta Nesbitt (1918–1975), xerox artist, fashion illustrator
Meret Oppenheim (1913–1985), sculptor
Juliet Pannett (1911–2005), portrait artist
Garnet Pavatea (1915–1981), potter
Margaret Elder Philbrick (1914 - 1999), printmaker
Tuulikki Pietilä (1917–2009), illustrator
Elizabeth Carney Pope (1910 – 1991), muralist
Mary M. Purser (1913-1986), painter
Lilo Rasch-Naegele (1914–1978), painter, graphic artist, fashion designer, book illustrator
Ruth Ray (1919–1977), painter
Miriam C. Rice (1918–2010), sculptor and textile artist
Hulda D. Robbins (1910–2011), printmaker
Maria Rudnitskaya (1916–1983), painter
Charlotte Salomon (1917–1943), painter
Amrita Sher-Gil (1913–1941), painter
Clara Sherman (1914–2010), textile artist
Nadezhda Shteinmiller (1915–1991), painter, stage designer
Sylvia Sleigh (1916–2010), painter 
Ann Hunt Spencer (1913 - 1972), painter
Thelma Johnson Streat (1911–1959), painter, dancer, educator
Hedda Sterne (1910–2011), painter
Dorothea Tanning (1910–2012), painter
Domicėlė Tarabildienė (1912–1985), graphic artist, sculptor, book illustrator
Gerda Taro (1910–1937), photographer
Angotigolu Teevee (1910–1967), printmaker
Anya Teixeira (1913–1992), photographer
Elsa Thiemann (1910–1981), photographer
Margaret Thomas (1916–2016), painter
Bridget Bate Tichenor (1917–1990), painter
Mary Van Blarcom (1913–1953), printmaker
Pablita Velarde (1918–2006), painter
Pauline Vinson (1915–1986), illustrator
Carol Weinstock (1914–1971), painter, printmaker
Alicia Wiencek Fiene (1918-1961), painter 
Marion Post Wolcott (1910–1990), photographer
Joan Elizabeth Woollard (1916–2008), sculptor
Tetyana Yablonska (1917–2005), painter

1920–1929
Carla Accardi (1924–2014), painter
Etel Adnan (1925–2021), painter, poet
Ruthadell Anderson (1922–2018), textile and fiber artist
Ida Applebroog (born 1929), painter
Diane Arbus (1923–1971), photographer
Pamela Ascherson (1923–2010), sculptor, illustrator
Alice Baber (1928–1982), painter
Jo Baer (born 1929), painter
Irina Baldina (1922–2009), painter
Hannelore Baron (1926–1987), collage artist
Lavinia Bazhbeuk-Melikyan (1922–2005), painter
Mona Beaumont (1927–2007), painter, printmaker
Brenda Bettinson (born 1929), artist, muralist, radio station art editor, and professor
Edith Birkin (1927–2018), painter 
Zlata Bizova (1927–2013), painter
Nell Blaine (1922–1996), painter
Sandra Blow (1925–2006), painter
Kossa Bokchan (1925–2009), painter
Druie Bowett (1924–1998), painter
Geta Bratescu (1926–2018), visual artist
Fanny Brennan (1921–2001), painter
Esther Bubley (1921–1998), photographer
Martha Burchfield (1924–1977), watercolorist
Crucita Calabaza (Blue Corn, c. 1920–1999), ceramic artist
Delores Churchill (born 1929), basket maker
Irene V. Clark (1927-1980), painter
Jean Cooke (1927–2008), Royal Academy artist
Marie Cosindas (1925–2017), photographer
Amanda Crowe (1928–2004), woodcarver
Jay DeFeo (1929–1989), painter, visual artist
Lois Dodd (born 1927), painter
Mavis Doering (1929–2007), Cherokee basket weaver
Rosalyn Drexler (born 1926), painter
Sonja Eisenberg (1926–2017), abstract painter
Monir Shahroudy Farmanfarmaian (1924–2019), sculptor
Francine Felsenthal (1922–2000), painter, printmaker
Lilly Fenichel (1927–2016), painter
Claire Fejes (1920–1998), sculptor
Jackie Ferrara (born 1929), sculptor
Mary Fitzpayne (born 1928), painter
Victorine Foot (1920–2000), painter
Helen Frankenthaler (1928–2011), painter
Jane Freilicher (1924–2014), painter
Sonia Gechtoff (1926–2018), painter
Ilka Gedő (1921–1985), painter, graphic artist
Mokarrameh Ghanbari (1928–2005), painter
Françoise Gilot (born 1921), painter, writer
Vee Guthrie (1920—2012), illustrator
Terry Haass (1923–2016), painter, printmaker, sculptor
Elaine Hamilton-O'Neal (1920–2010), painter
Edie McKee Harper (1922–2010), photographer, painter, lithography, sculpture
Grace Hartigan (1922–2008), painter
Pati Hill (1921–2014), copier artist
Frances Hodgkins (1869–1947), painter
Martha Holmes (1923–2006), photographer
Mansooreh Hosseini (1926–2012), painter
Olga Jančić (1929–2012), sculptor
Olga Jevrić (1922–2014), sculptor
Ynez Johnston (1920–2019), painter, printmaker, sculptor and educator
Ljubinka Jovanović (1920–2015), painter
Lila Katzen (1925–1998), sculptor
Cynthia Kenny (born 1929), painter
Ruth Kerkovius (1921–2007), painter, printmaker
Maya Kopitseva (1924–2005), painter
Tatiana Kopnina (1921–2009), painter
Elena Kostenko (1926–2019), painter
Marina Kozlovskaya (1925–2019), painter
Yayoi Kusama (born 1929), sculptor, performance art, installation art
Valeria Larina (1926–2008), painter
June Leaf (born 1929), painter, sculptor
Barbara Lekberg (1925–2018), metal sculptor
Elizabeth Jane Lloyd (1928–1995), painter, teacher
Eleanore Mikus (1927–2017), painter
Joan Mitchell (1925–1992), painter
Inge Morath (1923–2002), photographer
Emiko Nakano (1925–1990), painter, printmaker
Barbara Neustadt (1922–1998), printmaker, book artist
Anna-Stina Nilstoft (1928–2017), Swedish painter
Zelda Nolte (1929–2003), sculptor/woodblock printmaker
Margaret Olley (1923–2011), painter
Mimi Parent (1924–2005), painter
Pat Passlof (1928–2011), painter
Joanna Pettway (1924 - 1993), quilter
Sharni Pootoogook (1922–2003), printmaker
Ludmiła Popiel (1928–2011), painter
Galina Rumiantseva (1927–2004), painter
Kapitolina Rumiantseva (1925–2002), painter
Betye Saar (born 1926), assemblage sculpture
Ana Sacerdote (1925–2012), painter, video artist
Behjat Sadr (1924–2009), painter
Takako Saito (born 1929), installation art, performance art
Honoré Desmond Sharrer (1920–2009), painter
Alice Shaddle (1928 – 2017), sculptor
Sarai Sherman (1922–2013), painter, printmaker, sculptor
Galina Smirnova (1929–2015), painter
Doretta Frenna Smith (1924–2012), painter
Nancy Spero (1926–2009), painter
Katy Stephanides (1925–2012), painter
Dorothy Tanner (1923–2020), light sculptor
Hannah Tompkins (1920–1995), painter, printmaker
Anne Truitt (1921–2004), sculptor
Draginja Vlasic (1928–2011), painter
Nina Veselova (1922–1960), painter
Stella Waitzkin (1920–2003), painter
Jane Wilson (1924–2015), painter
Leona Wood (1921–2008), painter

1930–1939
Magdalena Abakanowicz (1930–2017), sculptor and graphic artist
Alice Adams (born 1930), sculptor, textile art, earthworks
Maliheh Afnan (1935–2016), mixed media artist
Gayleen Aiken (1934–2005), painter, musician
Susan Allix (b. 1934), book artist
Edith Altman (born 1931), painter, performance artist
Emma Andijewska (born 1931), painter, writer
 Maria Anto (1936–2007), Polish painter, poet, matron of the Art Prize
Electa Arenal (1935–1960), Mexican muralist
Helene Aylon (1931–2020), sculptor
Gillian Ayres (1930–2018), painter
Audrey Barker (1932–2002), installation artist
Mardi Barrie (1930–2004), painter
Mária Bartuszová (1936–1996), sculptor
Annemirl Bauer (1939–1989), painter
Baya (artist) (1931–1998), painter, potter
Zuleika Bazhbeuk-Melikyan (born 1939), painter
Hilla Becher (1934–2015), photographer
Mary Holiday Black (born c. 1934), Navajo basket maker
Karen Boccalero (1933–1997), printmaker
Maude Boltz (1939-2017), fiber artist
Lee Bontecou (born 1931), sculptor, printmaker
Pauline Boty (1938–1966), painter
Joan Brown (1938–1990), painter
P. Buckley Moss (born 1933), painter
Barbara Bullock (born 1938), painter, educator 
Judy Chicago (born 1939), installation artist
Chryssa (1933–2013), sculptor
Meinrad Craighead (1936–2019), painter, printmaker
Iran Darroudi (1936–2021), painter
Agnes Denes (born 1931), conceptual artist, multidisciplinary
Irina Dobrekova (born 1931), painter
Martha Edelheit (born 1931), painter
Lillian Wolock Elliott (1930–1994) American fiber artist, textile designer
Marisol Escobar (1930–2016), sculptor
Janet Fish (born 1938), painter
Audrey Flack (born 1931), painter, printmaker, sculptor
Eva Frankfurther (1930–1959), painter
Elisabeth Frink (1930–1993), sculptor, printmaker
Valerie Ganz (1936–2015), painter
Irina Getmanskaya (born 1939), painter
Tatiana Gorb (1935–2013), painter
Shirley Gorelick (1936–2000), painter
Elena Gorokhova (1933–2014), painter
Carmen Gracia (born 1935), printmaker
Nancy Graves (1939–1995), sculptor, painter, printmaker
Martha Nessler Hayden (born 1936), American painter
Mary Habsch (born 1931), Belgian painter and printmaker
Lee Hall (1934–2017), American abstract landscape painter, writer, university president
Eva Hesse (1936–1970), sculptor
Nicole Hollander (born 1939), illustration, comics
Valerie Hollister (born 1939), painter, printmaker
Nancy Holt (1938–2014), sculptor/ land art
Joan Jonas (born 1936), performance artist
Alison Knowles (born 1933), Fluxus, performance artist
Sara Leighton (born 1937), portrait painter
Lee Lozano (1930–1999), painter
Joan Lyons (born 1937), photographer, book artist
Althea McNish (c. 1933–2020), textile designer
Totte Mannes (born 1933), painter
Helena Markson (1934–2012), printmaker 
Emily Mason (1932–2019), painter
Leyly Matine-Daftary (1937–2007), modernist painter
Norma Minkowitz (b. 1937), fiber artist
Valentina Monakhova (born 1932), painter
Charlotte Moorman (1933–1991), performance artist, Fluxus
Lois Morrison (born 1934), book artist
Ree Morton (1933–1977), painter
Vera Nazina (born 1931), painter
Carol Heifetz Neiman (1937–1990), Xerox artist, printmaker, pastel, pencil, painter
Lorraine O'Grady (born 1934), performance art, installation art
Yoko Ono (born 1933), performance art, music
Marilyn Pappas (born 1931), textile artist
Fay Peck (1931–2016), American Expressionist artist
Nancy Petyarre (1934/38–2009), painter
Anirnik Ragee (born 1935), printmaker
Deborah Remington (1930–2010), painter
Bridget Riley (born 1931), painter
Faith Ringgold (born 1930), painter
Dorothea Rockburne (born 1932), painter
Carol Rosen (1933-2014), sculptor, collage and book artist
Marilyn R. Rosenberg (born 1934), book artist
Eliyakota Samualie (1939–1987), graphic artist and sculptor
Carolee Schneemann (1939–2019), performance artist
Joan Semmel (born 1932), painter
Genie Shenk (1937-2018), paper artist
Jacqueline Skiles (born 1937), printmaker, sculptor
Anita Steckel (1930–2012), graphic artist
Marjorie Strider (1931–2014), sculptor
Michelle Stuart (born 1933), painter, sculptor, photographer
Anita Louise Suazo (born 1937), ceramics
Atsuko Tanaka (1932–2005), painting, sculpture, performance art, installation art
Ana Vidjen (born 1931), sculptor

1940–1949
Pacita Abad (1946–2004), painter
Marina Abramović (born 1946), performance artist
Gretchen Albrecht, (born 1943), painter
Laurie Anderson (born 1947), performance artist
Heather Angel (born 1941), photographer, author
Germaine Arnaktauyok (born 1946), printmaker, painter
Alice Aycock (born 1946), sculptor
Tina Barney (born 1945), photographer, filmmaker
Jennifer Bartlett (born 1941), painter
Anne Bascove (born 1946), painter, printmaker, mixed media
Lynda Benglis (born 1941), sculptor
Judith Bernstein (born 1942), painter
Vivienne Binns (born 1940), painter, enamels
Shirley L. Bolton (1945-1984), painter
Melinda Bordelon (1949–1995), painter, illustrator
Fionnuala Boyd (born 1944), painter, photographer
Dina Bursztyn (born 1948), visual artist and writer
Deborah Butterfield (born 1949), sculptor
Kathleen Caraccio (b. 1947), printmaker
Rhea Carmi (born 1942), abstract expressionist and mixed-media artist
Squeak Carnwath (born 1947), painter
Vera Chino (born 1943), Acoma Pueblo ceramic artist
Suzanne Klotz (born 1944), painter, sculptor
Shelagh Cluett (1947–2007), sculptor fine art lecturer
Susan Crile (born 1942), painter
Lynn Davis (born 1944), photographer
Virginia Dotson (born 1943), woodworker
Orshi Drozdik (born 1946), photographer, sculptor, performance artist, painter, writer, conceptual artist
Bracha Ettinger (born 1948), painter, photographer, psychoanalyst, writer
Valie Export (born 1940), performance artist, video installations, photography
Carole Feuerman (born 1945), sculptor
Helen C. Frederick (born 1945), printmaker
Rose Garrard (born 1946), installation, video and performance
Teresa Gierzyńska (born 1947), Polish conceptual artist, photographer
Mary Giles (1944-2018), fiber artist
Jan Groover (1943–2012), photographer
Kathy Grove (born 1948), conceptual artist
Graciela Gutiérrez Marx (1945–2022), mail artist
Elisabeth Haarr (born 1945), textile artist
Maggi Hambling (born 1945), painter, sculptor
Helen Hardin (1943–1984), painter
Margaret Harrison (born 1940), painter
Masumi Hayashi (1945–2006), photographer
Judithe Hernández (born 1948) painter, muralist
Rebecca Horn (born 1944), sculptor, installation art
Miyako Ishiuchi (born 1947), photographer
Sanja Iveković (born 1949), interdisciplinary artist
Susan Kaprov (born 1946), multi-disciplinary artist
Rita Keegan (born 1949), multii-media artist
Mary Kelly (artist) (born 1941), installation art, interdisciplinary
Yvonne Walker Keshick (born 1946), quill artist and basket maker
Gayane Khachaturian (1942–2009), painter
Barbara Kozłowska (1940–2008), installation, environment artist, photographer 
Barbara Kruger (born 1945), conceptual artist
Annie Leibovitz (born 1949), photographer
Pat Lipsky, (born 1940), painter
Hung Liu, (1948–2021), painter
Kistat Lund (1944–2017), graphic artist, illustrator, painter
Markéta Luskačová (born 1944), photographer
Mary Ellen Mark (1940–2015), photographer
Linda McCartney (1942–1998), photographer
Rebecca Medel (born 1947) fiber artist
Susan Meiselas (born 1948), photographer
Ana Mendieta (1948–1985), performance art, sculptor
Annette Messager (born 1943), installation art, interdisciplinary
Tania Mouraud (born 1942), installation art, mixed media
Sheila Mullen (born 1942), painter
Glòria Muñoz (born 1949), painter
Elizabeth Murray (1940–2007), painter, printmaker
Avis Newman (born 1946), painter, sculptor
Gladys Nilsson (born 1940), painter
Guity Novin (born 1944), painter
Lydia Okumura (born 1948), sculptor
Orlan (born 1947) performance artist
Gloria Petyarre (1945–2021), painter
Adrian Piper (born 1948), conceptual artist
Sylvia Plachy (born 1943), photographer
Stephanie Pogue (1944–2002), printmaker
Susan Mohl Powers (born 1944), sculptor, painter
Helen Ramsaran (born 1943), sculptor
Judy Rifka (born 1945) painter, video artist
Elena del Rivero (b. 1949), multi media artist 
Suellen Rocca (1943–2020), painter
Barbara Rosenthal (born 1948), photographer
Martha Rosler (born 1943), photographer, performance, video
Barbara Rossi (born 1940), painter
Ursula von Rydingsvard (born 1942), sculptor
Kakulu Saggiaktok (1940–2020), visual artist
Barbara Schwartz (1949–2006), painter, sculptor
Carol Schwartzott (born 1945), book artist
Sandy Skoglund (born 1946), photographer
Hollis Sigler (1948–2001), painter
Joan Snyder (born 1940), painter
Annegret Soltau (born 1946), graphic, performance, video, photocollage
Pat Steir (born 1938), painter
Vicki Stone (born 1949), painter
Altoon Sultan (born 1948), painter
Carol Sutton (born 1945), painter
Berenice Sydney (1944–1983), paintings, drawings, prints, children's books, costume design, performance
Joyce Tenneson (born 1945), photographer
Gail Tremblay (born 1945), installation artist and basket weaver
Yvonne Edwards Tucker (born 1941), American potter
Mym Tuma (born 1940), painter and mixed-media artist
Lauretta Vinciarelli (1943–2011), painter, architect, educator
Vivian Wang (born 1945), sculptor
Anita Lynn Wetzel (1949 - 2021), paper artist
Hannah Wilke (1940–1993), sculptor, photographer
Annie Williams (born 1942), watercolour artist
Val Wilmer (born 1941), photographer, author
Jackie Winsor (born 1941), sculptor

1950–1959
Eija-Liisa Ahtila (born 1959), videographer, photographer
Peggy Ahwesh (born 1954), filmmaker
Davida Allen (born 1951), painter, filmmaker
Cecilia Alvarez (born 1950), painter, muralist
Annie Antone (born 1955), basket weaver
Anne Appleby (born 1954), painter
Sue Arrowsmith (1950–2014), photographic artist 
Imna Arroyo (born 1951), printmaker
Lynda Barry (born 1956), illustrator, comics
Jane Boyd (born 1953), installation
Lisa Bradley (born 1951), painter
Chrisann Brennan (born 1954), painter
Tara Bryan (1953-2020), painter, book artist
Chila Kumari Burman (born 1957), printmaker, painter, installation artist
Catherine Chalmers (born 1957), photographer
Sophie Calle (born 1953), photographer, author, installation artist, conceptual artist
Louisa Chase (1951–2016), painter, printmaker
Emily Cheng (born 1953), painter
Chinwe Chukwuogo-Roy (1952–2012), painter
Victoria Civera (born 1955), interdisciplinary artist, painter
Béatrice Coron (b. 1956), multi media artist
Sokari Douglas Camp (born 1958), sculptor
Susan Derges (born 1955), photographic artist
A. K. Dolven  (born 1953), painting, film, and interventions in public space
Lola Flash (born 1959), photographer
Cherryl Fountain (born 1950), still life, landscape and botanical artist
Joanne Gair (born 1958), painter, body art
Anne Geddes (born 1956), photographer
Anne Gilman (born 1953), mixed media
Nan Goldin (born 1953), photographer
Patricia Gonzalez (born 1958), painter
Jane Hammond (born 1950), painter, printmaker 
Akiko Hatsu (born 1959), illustrator, comics
Jenny Holzer (born 1950), conceptual artist
Roni Horn (born 1955), photographer
Mona Hatoum (born 1952), video, installation
Lubaina Himid (born 1954), mixed media
Leiko Ikemura (born 1951), painter, sculptor
Janel Jacobson  (b. 1950), ceramicist, wood carver
Terrell James (born 1955), painter, sculptor
Vanessa Paukeigope Jennings (born 1952), bead and textile artist
Claudette Johnson (born 1959), painter
Ann Kalmbach (b. 1950), book artist and printmaker
Christine Kermaire (b. 1953), book artist
Sharon Kerry-Harlan (b. 1951), textile artist
Deborah Kennedy (born 1953), sculptor, painter, contemporary art
Karen Kunc (born 1952). printmaker, book artist
Maya Lin (born 1959), installation artist
Marita Liulia (born 1957), photographer, digital and interactive media
Cynthia Lockhart (born 1952), textile artist
Sally Mann (born 1951), photographer
Soraida Martinez (born 1956), artist, designer
Michiko Matsumoto (born 1950), photographer
Emma McCagg (born 1957), painter, filmmaker
Moseka Yogo Ambake (1956–2019), painter
Shirin Neshat (born 1957), filmmaker, videographer, photographer
Deborah Niland (born 1950), painter, illustrator
Kilmeny Niland (1950–2009), painter, illustrator
Cady Noland (born 1956), sculptor
Cornelia Parker (born 1956), sculptor, drawing, installation artist
Elisa Pritzker (born 1955), contemporary artist
Ingrid Pollard (born 1953), portrait photographer
Valerie Pourier (born 1959), buffalo horn carver
Sheila Kanieson Ransom (born 1954), basket weaver
Shani Rhys James (born 1953), painter
Jenny Scobel (born 1955), painter
Cindy Sherman (born 1957), photographer, filmmaker
Noriko Shinohara (born 1953), multi-disciplinary artist
Li Shuang (born 1957), painter
Jiang Shuo (born 1958), sculptor
Kiki Smith (born 1954), sculptor, printmaker, installation art
Gilda Snowden (1954–2014), painter
Renee Stout (born 1958), photographer, installation art
Rumiko Takahashi (born 1957), illustrator, author
Zoja Trofimiuk (born 1952), sculptor, printmaker
Alison Turnbull (born 1956), painter, sculptor
Barbara Tyson Mosley (born 1950), American mixed media artist
Linda Vallejo (born 1951), painting, sculpture, ceramics
Carrie Mae Weems (born 1953), photographer, filmmaker
Nancy Worden (1954–2021), metalsmith
Emmi Whitehorse (born 1957), painter
Eva Janina Wieczorek  (born 1951), painter
Sue Williams (born 1956), British visual artist
Francesca Woodman (1958–1981), photographer

1960–1969

Jessica Abel (born 1969), illustrator, author
Yeşim Ağaoğlu (born 1966), installation art
Rachel Ara (born 1965), conceptual and data art
Sofia Areal (born 1960), painter
Cosima von Bonin (born 1962), concept art
Margarete Bagshaw (born 1964), painter
Fiona Banner (born 1966), wordscapes, sculpture, drawing, installation
Vanessa Beecroft (born 1969), performance art
Sonia Boyce (born 1962), mixed media, photography, installation, text
Cecily Brown (born 1969), painter
Tiffany Lee Brown (born 1969), interdisciplinary arts, performance, music, writing
Jo Bruton, b. 1967, British, painter
Michele Burgess (b. 1960), book artist
Carolyn Cole (born 1961), photographer
Justine Cooper (born 1968), mixed media
Cecilie Dahl (born 1960), installation artist
Tacita Dean (born 1965), film, drawing, photography, sound
Simone Decker (born 1968), artist working with photography and installations
Berlinde De Bruyckere (born 1964), painter, sculptor
Xiomara De Oliver (born 1967), Canadian painter
Inka Essenhigh (born 1969), painter
Mary Evans (artist) (born 1963), installation, works on paper
Abigail Fallis (born 1968), sculptor
Ceal Floyer (born 1968)
Anna Fox (born 1961), photographer
Else Gabriel (born 1962), performance artist and educator
Ellen Gallagher (born 1965), painter, mixed media artist
Patricia Goslee (born 1970), painter, curator
Brita Granström (born 1969), painter, illustrator, author
Maya Hayuk (born 1969), painter, muralist
Helen Hiebert (born 1965), paper artist
Taraneh Hemami (born 1960), multidisciplinary artist, installations, craft
Iva Honyestewa (born 1964), basket maker
Zuzanna Janin (born 1961), mixed-media, video artist, installation, sculptor
Chantal Joffe (born 1969), painter
Robin Kahn (born 1961), mixed-media, book artist
Lori Kay (born 1962), sculptor, mixed media
Hilja Keading (born 1960), video installation artist
Toba Khedoori (born 1964), sculptor, mixed-media, drawings, paintings
Rachel Khedoori (born 1964), sculptor, mixed-media
Lorena Kloosterboer (born 1962), painter, sculptor
Mariko Kusumoto (born 1967), fabric and metal artist 
Zoe Leonard (born 1961), photographer, visual artist
Vera Lutter (born 1960), mixed-media
Maria Marshall (born 1966), sculptor, painter, photographer, video artist
Chie Matsui (born 1960), installation artist
Amanda Matthews (born 1968), sculptor, painter, public art designer
Shari Mendelson (born 1961), American sculptor
Julie Anne Mihalisin, (born 1965), jewelry artist
Karin Monschauer, b. 1960, Luxembourg embroiderer and digital artist
Mariko Mori (born 1967), performance, installation
Debora Moore (born 1960), glass artist
Eva Navarro (born 1967), painter
Virginia Nimarkoh (born 1967), photo installations
Audrey Niffenegger (born 1963), printmaker, author
Catherine Opie (born 1961), photographer
Janette Parris (born 1963), drawing
Olivia Peguero (born 1962), painter, sculptor, author
Priya Pereira (b. 1967) book artist
Jennifer Wynne Reeves (1963–2014), painter
Lique Schoot (born 1969), painter, photographer, installation
Linda Sikora (born 1960), ceramist
Lorna Simpson (born 1960), photographer
Jonny Star (born 1964), sculptor, installation artist, collage artist
Maud Sulter (1960–2008), portraiture, montage
Roxanne Swentzell (born 1962), sculptor
Sarah Sze (born 1969), installation art
Tomoko Takahashi (born 1966), installation art
Ningiukulu Teevee (born 1963), illustrator
Jill Thompson (born 1966), illustrator, author
Patience Torlowei (born 1964), textile artist
Verónica Ruiz de Velasco (born 1968), painter
Kara Walker (born 1969), collage artist, painter, printmaker, installation artist
Bettina Werner (born 1965), artist who invented the textured colorized salt crystal technique as an art medium
Rachel Whiteread (born 1963), sculptor
Ingrid Wildi-Merino (born 1964), Chilean-Swiss video artist
Melanie Yazzie (born 1966), sculptor, painter, printmaker
Laurie Walker (artist) (born 1962), interdisciplinary artist
Christine Wilks b. 1960, British digital artist
gwendolyn yoppolo (born 1968), ceramist
Andrea Zittel (born 1965), painter, sculptor

The list ends with artists born in 1969. For later births see List of 21st-century women artists.

See also
Women artists
List of female comics creators
List of Lulu Award winners
Women in photography
List of women photographers
Photo-Secession
Tenth Street galleries
Beaver Hall Group
Native American women in the arts
List of female sculptors
List of women artists in the Armory Show

References

Orford, Emily-Jane Hills. (2008). "The Creative Spirit: Stories of 20th Century Artists". Ottawa: Baico Publishing. .

 
Lists of 20th-century people
 
 
Lists of 19th-century people
 
Lists of artists
Modern artists
Lists of women artists